This is a chronological list of mayors of Pleven, the seventh largest city of Bulgaria, since that post was established after the Liberation of Bulgaria in 1877–1878.

References
 The Mayors of Pleven (gallery). Pleven municipal website, accessed 4 April 2006.

See also
 List of mayors of Sofia
 List of mayors of Plovdiv
 List of mayors of Varna

Pleven